SFX Hall, sometimes referred to as SFX Theatre or The SFX, was a theatre located on Upper Sherrard Street, in Dublin, Ireland. The venue was named after the St Francis Xavier Hall and constructed in 1957, although a theater had been located on that site since the middle of the 19th century. The theatre served as the national concert hall, a home to the RTÉ Symphony Orchestra, and on occasion, large-scale performances. The venue had a standing capacity of 1000 and hosted pop and rock music concerts until 2001 when the shows were moved to the Ambassador Theatre. In 1982, the Irish band U2 performed three shows at the SFX in support of their album War. At one time the Dublin Theater Festival was housed at the SFX.

In 2006, SFX Theater was demolished to make way for 41 apartments.

Performances
Acts that have played the SFX include:

References

1953 establishments in Ireland
2001 disestablishments in Ireland
Buildings and structures in Dublin (city)
Concert halls in the Republic of Ireland
Theatres in Dublin (city)
Music in Dublin (city)
Music venues in Dublin (city)
Demolished buildings and structures in Dublin
Buildings and structures demolished in 2006